François Guillaume Jean Stanislaus Andrieux (6 May 17599 May 1833) was a French man of letters and playwright.

Life 
Born and educated at Strasbourg, Andrieux proceeded to Paris to study law. There he became a close friend of Collin d'Harleville. He became secretary to the duke of Uzes, and practised at the bar, but his attention was divided between his profession and literature.

He died on 9 May 1833 in Paris.

His plays are of the 18th century style, comedies of intrigue, but they rank with those of Collin d'Harleville among the best of the period next to those of Pierre Beaumarchais. Les Étourdis is probably his best comedy.

Works

Theatre 
1782: Anaximandre, ou le Sacrifice aux Grâces, comedy in one act and verse of ten syllables, Comédie Italienne, 20 December
1787: Les Étourdis, ou le Mort supposé, comedy in three acts and in verse, Théâtre-Italien, 14 December
1790: Louis IX en Égypte, opera in three acts by Nicolas-François Guillard and Andrieux, music by Jean-Baptiste Lemoyne, Académie royale de musique, 15 June.
1794: L'Enfance de Jean-Jacques Rousseau, comedy in one act mingled with ariettes, music by Nicolas Dalayrac, created at Opéra-Comique (salle Favart), (4 prairial an II) 23 May. 
1802: Helvétius, ou La Vengeance d’un sage, comedy in one act and in verse, Théâtre Louvois, 28 prairial an X.
1804: Le Trésor, comedy in five acts and in verse, Théâtre Louvois, 28 January.
1804: Molière avec ses amis, ou la Soirée d’Auteuil, comedy in one act and in verse, Théâtre-Français, 16 messidor an XII.
1808: La Suite du Menteur, comedy in five acts and in verse after Pierre Corneille, "With significant changes and additions and a prologue", Théâtre-Français, 29 October
1810: Le Vieux Fat, ou les Deux Vieillards, comedy in five acts and in verse, Théâtre-Français, 6 June
1830:  Lucius Junius Brutus, tragedy in five acts, Théâtre-Français, 13 September.
1816: Quelques scènes impromptu ou la Matinée du jour de l’an. Prologue pour l’ouverture du Théâtre royal de l’Odéon, sous la direction of M. Picard, Théâtre de l’Odéon, 1 January.
1816: La Comédienne, comedy in three acts and in verse, Théâtre-Français, 6 March.
1818: La Jeune Créole, comedy in five acts and in prose, "imitated from English by Richard Cumberland" 
1826: Le Rêve du mari, ou le Manteau, comedy in one act and in verse, Théâtre-Français, 20 May

Trivia 
1795: Querelle de Saint-Roch et de Saint-Thomas, sur l’ouverture du manoir céleste à Mlle Chamero.
1800: Contes et opuscules, en vers et en prose, suivis de poésies fugitives. Par Andrieux, de l'Institut National. Paris, Renouard. [À Paris, Chez Ant. Aug. Renouard, Libraire, rue St.-André-des-Arcs, n°. 42. VIII - 1800.] In-8°, [1 (faux-titre)], [1 bl.], [1 (titre)], [1 bl.], IV (avertissement), [1 (errata)], [1 bl.], 184 p. [original edition containing his most famous plays: Le Procès du sénat de Capoue, Le Doyen de Badajoz, Le Meûnier de Sans-Souci et le Dialogue entre deux journalistes sur les mots « Monsieur » et « Citoyen ».]
1806: Cours de grammaire et de belles-lettres : Sommaire des leçon 
1818–1823: Œuvres de François-Guillaume-Jean-Stanislas Andrieux (4 volumes)
1830–1831: Dialogues de l’orateur : Brutus ou Dialogue sur les orateurs illustres (2 volumes). Translation from Cicero.
1842: Poésies de François-Guillaume-Jean-Stanislas Andrieux.
1900: Récits et anecdotes

References 

Attribution:
 This cites:
 A. H. Taillandier, Notice sur la vie et les ouvrages d'Andrieux (1850)
 Sainte-Beuve, Portraits littéraires, vol. i.

Bibliography 
 Charles Rozan, Œuvres choisies d'Andrieux ; précédées d'une notice sur l'auteur, 1878

External links 
 François Andrieux on data.bnf.fr
 Notice biographique de l’Académie française
 His plays on CÉSAR

1759 births
1833 deaths
Writers from Strasbourg
18th-century French poets
18th-century French male writers
19th-century French poets
18th-century French dramatists and playwrights
19th-century French dramatists and playwrights
Jacobins
Members of the Council of Five Hundred
Members of the Académie Française
Academic staff of the Collège de France
Academic staff of École Polytechnique
Burials at Père Lachaise Cemetery